Praveena Bhagyaraj (died 1983) was an Indian actress who had worked mainly in Tamil, Telugu, Malayalam and Kannada films. She married director K. Bhagyaraj in 1981. Praveena starred in several films like Manmatha Leelai, Manthoppu Kiliye, Pasi, Billa and Bhama Rukmani.

Film career 
She made her debut in 1976 in the Tamil movie Manmadha Leelai, directed by K. Balachander, with Kamal Haasan in the lead role. After that, she has acted in films as supporting roles and minor roles, and also lead actress in a few movies. She has acted with Rajinikanth in Billa (1980). Billa was released on 26 January 1980, and became a commercial success, running for over 25 weeks in theatres.

Personal life 
In her early days, both Praveena and Bhagyaraj had a lot of trouble getting film offers. Praveena entered as an actress in the film industry. Praveena helped her boyfriend Bhagyaraj, who had little chance of progressing as the second hero and main supporting characters. When she taught Tamil to Bhagyaraj, they had love between them. Later, they both married in 1981.

Death 
Praveena died in September 1983 due to jaundice.

Filmography

References

External links 
 

Tamil actresses
Indian actresses
1983 deaths
Indian film actresses
20th-century Indian actresses
1958 births